Laknavaram Lake is a lake in  Govindaraopet mandal in Mulugu district.

History 
Laknavaram Lake is built by the Kakatiya dynasty in 13th century.

Geography 
It irrigates over 3,500 acres of land. It was built by Kakatiya kings. It has about 13 islands in it and has a 160 metres long hanging bridge, which connects three islands. It is surrounded by a thick deciduous forest and it is a very popular tourist spot.

Facilities 
Telangana tourism developed new accommodation at Laknavaram Lake.

The new facilities including cottages, a viewing tower, a pantry, and a ferry from the main banks to the island.

Awards
The wooden air-conditioned cottages at the resorts of lake has bagged the most innovative product at the travel and tourism fair held at Kolkata.

References

External links
Laknavaram Lake Details

Lakes of Telangana
Mulugu district